is a Buddhist temple of the Kōyasan Shingon school located in Bizen, Okayama Prefecture, Japan.

The temple is located atop Mount Enichi.

The temple was first constructed as Hattō-ji in 728 by the monk Dōkyō at the request of Emperor Shōmu. The temple was renamed to Kōken-ji in 1830.

Access 
 JR railway service: From Okayama Station, proceed on JR Sanyo main line to Yoshinaga Station (approx. 35min.). From Yoshinaga Station, proceed by bus or taxi (see below). 
 Bizen bus: From Yoshinaga Station, take a bus for Hattoji (approx. 30min.\200). There are no bus services on Sundays and national holidays.
 Taxi: From Yoshinaga Station to Hattoji : approx. 25mins. \4,500
 By car: Via Sanyo Expressway (exit at Bizen I.C.) => National Route 2 turn right for Shizutani School and Yoshinaga. Follow signs for Hattoji Furusato Village

External links 
 Kōken-ji official site
 Okayama Prefecture Sightseeing

References 

 Yoshinaga town history month committee, Bizen City 2006, pages 11, 54, 78, 196, 206, 326, 531.
 , Heibonsha 1988, .

Buddhist temples in Okayama Prefecture
Kōyasan Shingon temples